The Central District of Jolfa County is in East Azerbaijan province, Iran. At the National Census in 2006, its population was 43,669 in 12,100 households. The following census in 2011 counted 46,730 people in 13,844 households. At the latest census in 2016, the district had 53,352 inhabitants in 16,955 households.

References 

Jolfa County

Districts of East Azerbaijan Province

Populated places in East Azerbaijan Province

Populated places in Jolfa County